Sonbarsha Assembly constituency is an assembly constituency in Saharsa district in the Indian state of Bihar. It is reserved for scheduled castes from 2010. Earlier, it was an open seat.

Overview
As per Delimitation of Parliamentary and Assembly constituencies Order, 2008, No. 74 Sonbarsha Assembly constituency (SC) is composed of the following:
Sonbarsha, Patarghat and Banma Itahri community development blocks.

Sonbarsha Assembly constituency is part of No. 13 Madhepura (Lok Sabha constituency) .

Members of Legislative Assembly

Election results

2020

1977-2010
In the 2010 state assembly elections, Ratnesh Sada of JD(U) won the Sonbarsha assembly seat defeating Sarita Devi of LJP. Contests in most years were multi cornered but only winners and runners up are being mentioned. Kishor Kumar, Independent, defeated Ranjit Yadav of RJD in October 2005 and Ashok Kumar Singh of RJD in February 2005. Ashok Kumar Singh defeated Kishor Kumar Singh, Independent, in 2000. Ashok Kumar Singh of JD defeated Tej Narayan Yadav, Independent, in 1995, and K.K. Mandal of Congress in 1990. Surya Narayan Yadav of aLD defeated Tej Narayan Yadav of CPI in 1985. Surya Narayan Yadav of Congress (U) defeated K.K. Mandal of Congress in 1980. Ashok Kumar Singh of JP defeated Surya Narayan Yadav, Independent, in 1977.

References

External links
 

Assembly constituencies of Bihar
Politics of Saharsa district